Ragnar A. Stenbäck (24 May 1908 – 15 June 1963) was a Finnish sailor. The son of Gunnar Stenbäck, he competed in the mixed 6 metres at the 1936 Summer Olympics.

References

1908 births
1963 deaths
Sportspeople from Helsinki
Olympic sailors of Finland
Sailors at the 1936 Summer Olympics – 6 Metre
Finnish male sailors (sport)